Fable Legends is a cancelled cooperative action role-playing video game developed by Lionhead Studios and projected to be published by Microsoft Studios for Microsoft Windows and Xbox One. Microsoft cancelled the game on 7 March 2016. The servers shut down on 13 April.

Gameplay
Fable Legends was based around four Heroes and a Villain. Each role may be filled by a player via online multiplayer or by an AI. The same game experience was possible regardless of multiplayer or single player (with four AI). All of the game's story and quests could have been played single player, using AI heroes as sidekicks or enemies. It was possible to play through the game's content as either a Hero or as a Villain.

During each quest, the four Hero characters must use teamwork to succeed in their objectives, while the Villain player opposes them with an army of creatures.

Heroes
Each Hero in Fable Legends was to be a unique character with unique abilities, powers, and gameplay. Several playable heroes were  identified as: Sterling, a Prince Charming type of character, who flourishes a rapier and wise cracks; Winter, who is focused on will-based abilities and ice attacks; Rook, focusing on ranged combat with a crossbow; and Inga, a paladin-like character wearing heavy armor, and wielding a sword and shield. Players can customise any Hero, ranging from colour and aces to outfits. Customisations would have been unlocked either with earned in-game silver (in game currency), or by purchasing them with real life money. Some cosmetic items may have only been purchasable.

Hero Rotation
A limited amount of heroes would have been available for free at a given time, after which a new set of heroes would take their place for everybody to play for a period of time. Heroes could have also been purchased for permanent access by earned in-game currency or by real-life currency.

Villains
The villain player controls the nature of the quest the hero characters embark on, such as where enemies spawn, how aggressive they are, when the boss will come lumbering out of its lair, when to bring down an impassable portcullis or lay a trap to separate heroes from each other to thwart them. The Villain has a certain amount of "creature points", which he uses during a setup phase to plan his strategy. Each creature costs a certain number of points to summon. During setup, the Villain can also place a certain number of interactive objects in the quest, such as traps and gates.

Once the battle has begun, the Villain player focuses on ordering his creatures about in real time in a similar manner to an RTS game. He can order the creatures to attack a specific Hero, to activate special abilities, and to position for ambushes. During combat, he can also activate gates to damage and split up the Heroes, and use his traps to distract and wound them.

Social play
Like other games in the series, Fable Legends would allow players to interact with villagers and customize their characters with weapons, looks, armour, abilities and more. In the hub-city of Brightlodge, players would have had the opportunity to partake in jobs, play mini-games and enjoy pub games. Once the player selects a quest, they would be sent out into the world.

Platforms
Since the game has multiplayer capabilities, players would require an active Xbox Live subscription to play on Xbox One. On Windows 10, it was set to have a free-to-play model.

Gameplay would have been in sync across platforms. Players could've played on Windows 10 and continue their progress on Xbox One and vice versa.

Synopsis
Fable Legends takes place several hundred years before the events of the original trilogy. This is a period of magic, folklore, and mythology, and humanity has yet to discover meaningful technology. Most people huddle in small villages, too witless and scared to venture out into the scary world about. Heroes are more common, but there is no Heroes' Guild yet, and the Heroes must rely on each other to succeed.

The story of one quest revealed at gamescom told of an ancient artifact called "The Moon on the Stick", which the children of Albion once made wishes to. The heroes in Fable Legends are on a quest to locate this artifact.

Development
Fable Legends began development in the summer of 2012 and was announced on 20 August 2013 with a cinematic trailer directed by Ben Hibon and narrated by Michael Gambon as the Villain. The first revealed gameplay footage was shown in June 2014 with gameplay performed on stage by the development team. A limited, closed multiplayer beta began on 16 October. Made on a budget of around $75 million, it was going to be one of the most expensive video games of all times.

The game was intended to have a 5–10 year lifecycle, and to be integrated into the cloud features of the Xbox One. SmartGlass features would have allowed villain players to make their plan of attack before a quest.

Microsoft also intended to release Fable Legends on Windows 10, exclusive to the Windows 10 Store. The game would have featured cross-platform multiplayer between Microsoft Windows and Xbox One. Also support for DirectX 12 was to be added with the game's release.

Lionhead confirmed that the game would use a free-to-play model. Initially for 2015, the game was officially delayed to following year, so as to give additional time for Lionhead Studios to polish the game. An open beta was set to be available in the first or second quarter of 2016.

Cancellation
Microsoft cancelled the game in March 2016 and closed Lionhead Studios. The game's beta ended on 13 April, with players who had purchased in-game gold receiving full refund from all in-game purchases.

References

External links

Fable Legends at Xbox.com

Action role-playing video games
Asymmetrical multiplayer video games
Cancelled Windows games
Cancelled Xbox One games
Cooperative video games
Fable (video game series)
Free-to-play video games
Lionhead Studios games
Microsoft games
Unreal Engine games
Video game prequels
Video games developed in the United Kingdom
Video games featuring protagonists of selectable gender
Video games scored by Russell Shaw